Antonio Soto may refer to:

 Tony Soto (politician) (born 1973), Puerto Rican politician
 Antonio Dorado Soto (1931–2015), Spanish Roman Catholic bishop
 Antonio Soto (syndicalist) (1897–1963), anarcho-syndicalist leader in the rural strikes in the Patagonia of Argentina
 Antonio Jesús Soto (born 1994), Spanish cyclist
 Antonio Soto Díaz (1949–2016), Puerto Rican politician
 Antonio Soto Sánchez (born 1961), Mexican politician
 Antonio Díaz Soto y Gama (1880–1967), Mexican politician and revolutionary